Beehama is a village located in the central area of district Ganderbal, Jammu and Kashmir. The route of Beehama leads towards Kheer Bhawani, Manasbal, Sonamarg, Gadsar, Harmukh Mountain and Gangbal.

References 

Villages in Ganderbal district